The Éditions de l'Olivier are a French publishing house created by Olivier Cohen and located  96 Boulevard du Montparnasse, in the 14th arrondissement of Paris. Established in 1991, this company specializes in French and foreign literature.

External links 
 Olivier Cohen: Éditeur est un métier étrange on L'Express
 Éditeur : Editions de l'Olivier
 Focus sur les éditions de l’Olivier avec son fondateur Olivier Cohen
 Olivier Cohen - Editions de l'Olivier on YouTube
 Official website
 Catalog on Babelio

Book publishing companies of France
Publishing companies established in 1991
14th arrondissement of Paris